
The Aztec Lady is a stage illusion designed by British magician Robert Harbin.  It is a classic "big box" illusion that involves an assistant in a cabinet and is probably best categorised as a restoration-type illusion.

Description
The performance begins with the magician being joined by a spectator (who might be an audience member or the host of a show of which this illusion is a part). A large upright cabinet is presented. It is just large enough to contain a person and has a stylised sillouette of a woman on the front. A female assistant is introduced. It is explained that the box divides into four sections, as indicated by lines on its front, and the assistant will be cut into four pieces. The box is opened and the assistant steps inside. She crouches down to show the individual sections of the box are apparently too small to hold her. She then stands up again and her wrists are tied to cords within the top sections of the box. It is pointed out that the only way she can move out of position would be to untie herself with her teeth and then re-tie herself at the end of the trick. The box is closed up and blades are inserted to divide it into four sections as indicated by the lines on the front. The top sections are then hinged downwards so that all four sections are resting on the ground. The bottom sections are also hinged apart—so the result is the four sections appear to be separated although they remain connected at their edges by hinges. The magician then brings out two swords. He thrusts one sword into a couple of the boxes and invites the spectator to thrust the other sword into the remaining sections. The box is then re-assembled and the blades are removed. The box is then hinged apart to show the girl safe and well and still tied up inside.

History
The history of this illusion is vague and not well documented and it is sometimes confused with other Harbin illusions including the Jigsaw Lady. However a number of pictures exist showing different performances. One performance in January 1972 involved The Vernon Sisters singing group as assistants. A brief glimpse of another performance is seen in the British television documentary Heroes of Magic.

Footnotes

Bibliography
 R. Harbin, The Harbin Book, pub. M. Breese (1983), 
 R. Harbin, Harbincadabra, brainwaves and brainstorms of Robert Harbin: From the pages of Abracadabra, 1947-1965, pub. Goodliffe (1979, Worcestershire, UK)

External links
 Plans and description from Osbourne Illusions
 A page at The Magic Cave website featuring a photo from a magic magazine showing a performance from 1972.
Video of illusion performed by Robert Harbin

Magic tricks